Shorea angustifolia is a tree in the family Dipterocarpaceae, native to Borneo. The specific epithet angustifolia means narrow-leaved.

Description
It has buttresses. The flaky bark is greyish tan-coloured.

Distribution and habitat
Shorea angustifolia is endemic to Borneo.

Conservation
Shorea angustifolia has been assessed as near threatened on the IUCN Red List. It is threatened by conversion of land for plantations, including for palm oil. It is also threatened by logging, sometimes for its timber. The species is found in some protected areas including national parks.

References

angustifolia
Endemic flora of Borneo
Plants described in 1962
Flora of the Borneo lowland rain forests